The 2006 San Diego State Aztecs football team represented San Diego State University in the 2006 NCAA Division I FBS football season.  They were coached by Chuck Long and played their home games at Qualcomm Stadium.

Schedule

Roster

References

San Diego State
San Diego State Aztecs football seasons
San Diego State Aztecs football